The Kensington Oval is a 15,000-capacity sports stadium located in Bridgetown on the island nation of Barbados. Used mainly for cricket, the Kensington Oval hosted its first Test in 1930 and its first One Day International (ODI) in 1985. The ground has seen 51 Tests—all including the West Indies—along with 30 ODIs, and has been the scene of 108 Test and 14 ODI centuries. Additionally, the ground hosted a pair of World Series Cricket one-day games and a Supertest between the WSC West Indies and WSC Australian teams.

West Indian Clifford Roach became the first player to score a century at the venue, managing 122 runs in the ground's inaugural match. Two other batsmen, Andy Sandham and George Headley from England and the West Indies respectively, also scored centuries in this match. However, it took a further four Tests until West Indian Clyde Walcott scored the next hundred, 220 in 1954. The innings was also the first double century to be scored at the Kensington Oval. Pakistani Hanif Mohammad's score of 337, which was achieved in 1958, remains the highest score seen at the ground, while West Indian Lawrence Rowe is the only other batsman to score a triple century at the venue, hitting 302 against England in 1974. Desmond Haynes, Clive Lloyd and Shivnarine Chanderpaul are the only players to score four Test centuries at the Kensington Oval, while Garry Sobers, Viv Richards and Brian Lara have all stuck three hundreds. As of January 2019, 9 batsmen have scored double centuries and two triple centuries has scored at the venue.

In the first ODI at the venue, Haynes scored 116 from 138 balls against New Zealand in 1985—the only century in the match. He is also one of only two players to hit two centuries in ODIs at the ground; scoring 117 not out from 132 balls against India in 1989. West Indian Brian Lara is the other batsman, with scores of 110 from 106 deliveries against England in 1998 and 116 from 106 balls against Sri Lanka in 2003. Australian Geoff Marsh became the first touring batsman to score an ODI century at the Kensington Oval, scoring 113 from 136 balls against the West Indies. Fellow countryman Adam Gilchrist holds the record for the highest ODI score with 149 from 104 deliveries, hit during the 2007 Cricket World Cup final against Sri Lanka.

Key
 * denotes that the batsman was not out.
 Inns. denotes the number of the innings in the match.
 Balls denotes the number of balls faced in an innings.
 NR denotes that the number of balls was not recorded.
 Parentheses next to the player's score denotes his century number at the Kensington Oval.
 The column title Date refers to the date the match started.
 The column title Result refers to whether the player's team won, lost or if the match was drawn.

Test centuries

The following table summarises the Test centuries scored at the Kensington Oval.

One Day International centuries

The following table summarises the One Day International centuries scored at the Kensington Oval.

World Series Cricket centuries

References 

Kensington Oval
Cricket grounds in Barbados
Cricket centuries